Marco Napolioni (born 16 June 1975 in Rome) is an Italian footballer. He plays as a midfielder. After playing in S.S. Lazio youth teams (where he won the Campionato Nazionale Primavera in 1994–1995) he is sold to Lodigiani where he made his professional debut. He played his whole career in Serie C1 and Serie C2, with the exception of a year in Serie B with Salernitana.

Career
1995-1996  Lodigiani 33 (3) 
1996-1997  Pistoiese 30 (1) 
1997-1998  Salernitana 8 (0) 
1998-1999  Foggia 16 (0) 
1999-2002  Catania 71 (1) 
2002-2004  Sambenedettese 55 (6) 
2004-2005  Reggiana 31 (2) 
2005-2007  Lucchese 57 (1) 
2007-2008  Nuorese 29 (1) 
2008-2009  Cuoiopelli 24 (1) 
2009-2010  Latina  ? (?)

See also
Football in Italy
List of football clubs in Italy

References

External links
 

Living people
Italian footballers
1975 births
Association football midfielders